The Magothy Formation is a geologic formation in Maryland. It preserves fossils dating back to the Turonian stage of the Cretaceous period.

See also 
 List of fossiliferous stratigraphic units in Maryland
 Paleontology in Maryland

References 

Geologic formations of Maryland
Geologic formations of New Jersey
Cretaceous Maryland
Cretaceous geology of New Jersey
Upper Cretaceous Series of North America
Turonian Stage